Sandy Lake Academy is a Private Boarding Jr.P-12 school that is affiliated with the Seventh-day Adventist Church.  It is owned and operated by the Maritime Conference of Seventh-day Adventists, and is the only Canadian Seventh-day Adventist high school east of Montreal, and one of three boarding academies operated by the Seventh-day Adventist Church in Canada.  As a part of the Seventh-day Adventist school system, it is a part of the second-largest Christian school system in the world.

History

Sandy Lake Academy initially began in 1927 as a one-teacher elementary school with ten students operating out of the basement of the Halifax Seventh-day Adventist church.  In 1962, growing student enrollment led to the school expanding to a two teacher operation offering up to grade 10.  By 1968 the school once again needed to expand, adding a third classroom.  This growth eventually caused the school to outgrow the church basement, and plans were made to move the school to its own property.  In 1971, a property was purchased partway between Halifax and Dartmouth in Bedford, Nova Scotia so that the school could serve both cities; and in 1974, the new school building was complete and classes began that fall.  As the property was on the shore of Sandy Lake, the school was renamed Sandy Lake Academy.

Initially, the new school offered grades 1-10, taught by four teachers, with an enrollment of 90.  The original school building contained a gymnasium and five classrooms, in preparation for future expansion.  School was offered four days a week at first in order to accommodate the increased distance students had to travel to get to the new school; some students chose to find a boarding room near the school.  In 1981, the school expanded to offer grade 12; around the same time, a science lab, home economics room, and an industrial arts facility were added to the building to support the high school expansion.  That same year, an Adventist church was established at Bedford to support the staff and students of the school.  In 1988 a dormitory was built, which allowed SLA to accept boarding students from across the Maritimes, as well as internationally.  This change led Sandy Lake Academy to become a conference school, supported by the Maritime Conference of Seventh-day Adventists.

In 1996, Bedford merged with Dartmouth and Halifax to form the Halifax Regional Municipality, which brought the school back inside the borders of Halifax.  Further expansions to the school created a primary program in 1997, and a junior primary program in 2014.  Between 1974, when the school moved to the current Sandy Lake site, to the present, enrollment fluctuated between 50 and 90 students.

Academics

Sandy Lake Academy is a full Jr.P-12 academy, accredited by the North American Division of Seventh-day Adventists.  SLA uses the curriculum provided by the Nova Scotia Department of Education, and also follows the curriculum guides from the North American Division of Seventh-day Adventists.  The high school diploma issued by Sandy Lake Academy is based on academic coursework done by the student between grades 10-12.

Sandy Lake employs 8 teachers, for a student to teacher ratio of 10:1.  Courses offered include math, English, science, socials, religious studies, French, physical education, music, and a few electives.

Music

Sandy Lake Academy is known for its music program, and music forms its primary extracurricular activity.  Students are trained in music starting in junior primary, and when students reach secondary school, they have the choice of going on musical tours.  Musical activities offered at SLA includes choir, handbells, piano, and orchestra.  The high school choir is named the SLA MasterPeace Touring Choir and performs several times per year across the Maritimes.

See also

Seventh-day Adventist Church
Seventh-day Adventist education
List of Seventh-day Adventist secondary and elementary schools

References

External links
Sandy Lake Academy webpage

Private schools in Nova Scotia
Adventist secondary schools in Canada
Educational institutions established in 1927
Elementary schools in Nova Scotia
Middle schools in Nova Scotia
High schools in Halifax, Nova Scotia
Boarding schools in Nova Scotia
1927 establishments in Canada